Woolwich railway station is an Elizabeth line station in Woolwich in London, England which opened on 24 May 2022, and has up to 12 trains per hour to Canary Wharf and Central London.

History
Woolwich railway station (not to be confused with the similarly named Woolwich Arsenal station) was built as part of the Crossrail rail project to provide infrastructure for the Elizabeth line. Crossrail was jointly sponsored by the Department for Transport (DfT) and Transport for London (TfL). The construction of a station at Woolwich was not proposed as part of the original Crossrail route. However, after talks between Greenwich London Borough Council and developer Berkeley Homes about the £162 million required for the station, the House of Commons Select Committee recognised its inclusion in March 2007.

Construction
In May 2021, Crossrail said that Woolwich station had recently entered the T-12 process, meaning that the station was considered to be 12 weeks away from handover to TfL. Reaching this milestone meant that work was now focused on testing and commissioning systems, and the contractor began demobilising staff across the site. The station was officially handed over to TfL on 25 June 2021, and opened along with the rest of the Elizabeth line from Paddington to Abbey Wood on 24 May 2022.

Site 

The station was built on the southeast portion of the Crossrail line that ends at Abbey Wood, and is the penultimate station on this branch. The Woolwich redevelopment site at Royal Arsenal is a modern waterside housing and retail development area adjacent to the station.

The site was developed with the construction of approximately 2,517 new homes, in addition to the 1,248 homes already built. The area is also to include a new cultural quarter known as Woolwich Works, as well as infrastructural developments such as retail stores, restaurants and cafes, offices, hotels and a cinema.

Design 

The station was built by Balfour Beatty after a design by Weston Williamson, Mott MacDonald and Arup Group (engineering). The station entrance in Dial Arch Square features a  bronze-clad portal. Natural light will enter through the main entrance and ceiling into the ticket hall, whilst a connection to daylight is present below ground on the platforms. 

Set back from the main street and surrounded by a series of heritage listed buildings and a large retail unit, the station acts as a simple portal connecting all these elements together. The station entrance opens out on to Dial Arch Square, a green space, flanked by a series of Grade I and II listed buildings. In addition to enhancing the experience in and out of the station, the urban realm design also helps connect the station with the wider town centre. In addition to the station improvements, Crossrail has been working with the Royal Borough of Greenwich on proposals for improvements to the area around the station.

Services

Elizabeth line services began calling at Woolwich on 24 May 2022 and all services are operated using  EMUs.

The typical off-peak service in trains per hour is:
 8 tph to 
 2 tph to 
 2 tph to 

Connections 
The closest existing station is Woolwich Arsenal which has National Rail and Docklands Light Railway services. The stations are separate but within a short walking distance of each other, and have an out-of-station interchange. There are also Thames Clipper river bus services from Woolwich Arsenal Pier to central London. London Buses routes 53, 54, 96, 99, 122, 161, 177, 180, 244, 291, 301, 380, 422, 469, 472 and night routes N1 and N53 serve the station.

References

External links

Railway stations in the Royal Borough of Greenwich
Railway stations served by the Elizabeth line
Railway stations in Great Britain opened in 2022
Railway stations located underground in the United Kingdom
Woolwich